Daniel Fernández Crespo (28 April 1901 – 28 July 1964) was a Uruguayan political figure.

Background and early career

Fernández Crespo belonged to the National Party, and entered politics in the early 1930s. Formerly a schoolteacher, by the time he assumed Presidential office he had achieved a reputation as a prolific sponsor of reformist legislation, including in the fields of accident insurance and pensions. From 1954 till 1958 he served as minority member of the National Council of Government of Uruguay.

In 1963 his National Party colleague Faustino Harrison stepped down from the Presidency of the Council.

President of Uruguay

He became President of the National Council of Government of Uruguay in 1963.

In 1964 he was succeeded as President by another National Party colleague, Luis Giannattasio, who died in office.

Death and legacy

Fernández Crespo died on 28 July 1964, a few months after leaving office .

A road in the capital, Montevideo, is named after him.

References

External links

 Photo

1901 births
1964 deaths
Place of birth missing
Presidents of the National Council of Government (Uruguay)
Intendants of Montevideo
People from San José Department
Uruguayan people of Spanish descent
National Party (Uruguay) politicians
Uruguayan football chairmen and investors